Martin Štěpanovský (born 17 July 1988) is a Czech footballer. He plays goalkeeper for 1. SC Znojmo. He has played for many teams over the last ten years. Over those ten years, he has appeared in forty games, for a total of 3600 minutes. In that time he has had ten clean sheets, conceded sixty-four goals, and earned one yellow card.

References

External links 

1988 births
Living people
Czech footballers
Association football goalkeepers
FC Vysočina Jihlava players
FK Bohemians Prague (Střížkov) players
FK Slavoj Vyšehrad players
FK Frýdek-Místek players
1. SC Znojmo players
Czech National Football League players